A total of 64 Japanese-born players have played in at least one Major League Baseball (MLB) game. Of these players, five are currently on MLB rosters. The first instance of a Japanese player playing in MLB occurred in 1964, when the Nankai Hawks, a Nippon Professional Baseball (NPB) team, sent three exchange prospects to the United States to gain experience in MLB's minor league system. One of the players, pitcher Masanori Murakami, was named the California League Rookie of the Year while playing for the Fresno Giants (the San Francisco Giants' Class-A team).
Giants executives were impressed with his talent and on September 1, 1964 Murakami was promoted, thus becoming the first Japanese player to play in MLB, as well as being the first Asian player. After Murakami put up good pitching statistics as a reliever, Giants executives sought to exercise a clause in their contract with the Hawks that, they claimed, allowed them to buy up an exchange prospect's contract. NPB officials objected, stating that they had no intention of selling Murakami's contract to the Giants and telling them that Murakami was merely on loan for the 1964 season. After a two-month stalemate the Giants eventually agreed to send Murakami back to the Hawks after the 1965 season. This affair led to the 1967 United States – Japanese Player Contract Agreement, also known as the "Working Agreement", between MLB and NPB, which was basically a hands-off policy.

For thirty years Murakami was the only Japanese player to appear in an MLB game.  Pitcher Hideo Nomo, with the help of agent Don Nomura, became the second Japanese player to play in MLB in 1995. Nomo, who was not yet eligible for free agency in Japan, was advised by Nomura that a "voluntary retirement" clause in the Working Agreement did not specify that a player wishing to play again after retiring must return to NPB. Nomo utilized this loophole to void his NPB contract with the Kintetsu Buffaloes and play in MLB. He announced his retirement from NPB in late 1994 and signed with the Los Angeles Dodgers in February 1995. Nomo's maneuver and Hideki Irabu's later MLB contractual complications were contributing factors to a major revision of the Working Agreement in 1998 that created the current posting system. Since its inception 16 Japanese players have been signed through the system, however one of these players, Shinji Mori, did not play in a single MLB game due to an injury. NPB players who have nine or more years of playing service with NPB can become international free agents and do not need to enter MLB through the posting system. The remaining Japanese players that have played in MLB have either signed as free agents or signed as amateur players. Mac Suzuki, Kazuhito Tadano, and Junichi Tazawa are the only Japanese players to have debuted in MLB without previously playing in NPB. All 30 MLB teams have had at least one Japanese player on their roster.

Japanese players have had a range of success in MLB. Twelve players have been selected to participate in the All-Star Game; Ichiro Suzuki has made the most appearances with ten. In addition to these selections, Ichiro has won several prestigious MLB awards including the American League (AL) Rookie of the Year Award and the AL Most Valuable Player (MVP) Award in 2001, the All-Star Game MVP Award in 2007 and multiple Gold Glove and Silver Slugger Awards. Ichiro also holds the MLB record for the recording the most hits in a single season. Hideo Nomo was the only Japanese pitcher to throw a no-hitter until Hisashi Iwakuma accomplished the feat on August 12, 2015. Nomo threw two in total; the first came in 1996 and the last occurred in 2001. Thirteen Japanese players have played in the World Series. Of these players, So Taguchi has won the most with two and Hideki Matsui is the only one to win the World Series MVP Award. The 2007 World Series had the most Japanese players, with Daisuke Matsuzaka and Hideki Okajima pitching for the Boston Red Sox, and Kazuo Matsui playing for the Colorado Rockies.

Table key

Current players

* Games played through the 2022 regular season.

Former players

Awards, records and notable accomplishments

Seattle Mariners Hall of Fame
Ichiro Suzuki, inducted on August 27, 2022.

Awards and accolades
Commissioner's Historic Achievement Award: Ichiro Suzuki, 2005; Shohei Ohtani, 2021
Most Valuable Player Award: Ichiro Suzuki, 2001 AL; Shohei Ohtani, 2021 AL (unanimous selection)
Rookie of the Year Award: Hideo Nomo, 1995 NL; Kazuhiro Sasaki, 2000 AL; Ichiro Suzuki, 2001 AL; Shohei Ohtani, 2018 AL
World Series MVP: Hideki Matsui, 2009
ALCS MVP: Koji Uehara, 2013
All-Star Game MVP: Ichiro Suzuki, 2007
Gold Glove Award: Ichiro Suzuki, 10 times, 2001–2010 AL OF
Silver Slugger Award: Ichiro Suzuki, thrice, 2001, 2007, 2009 AL OF; Shohei Ohtani, 2021 AL DH
Edgar Martínez Award: Shohei Ohtani, twice, 2021, 2022
All-MLB Team: Yu Darvish, First team SP 2020; Kenta Maeda, Second team SP 2020; Shohei Ohtani, First team DH/Second team SP 2021, First team SP/Second team DH 2022
Player of the Month: Shohei Ohtani, twice, June, July 2021 AL; Ichiro Suzuki, August 2004 AL; Hideki Matsui, July 2007 AL;
Pitcher of the Month: Hideo Nomo, twice, June 1995, September 1996 NL; Hideki Irabu, twice, May 1998, July 1999 AL; Yu Darvish, twice, July/August 2020, September 2022 NL; Masahiro Tanaka, May 2014 AL
Rookie of the Month: Ichiro Suzuki, 4 times, April, May, August, September 2001 AL; Shohei Ohtani, twice, April, September 2018 AL; Kazuhisa Ishii, April 2002 NL; Hideki Matsui, June 2003 AL; Hideki Okajima, April 2007 AL; Yu Darvish, April 2012 AL; Seiya Suzuki, April 2022 NL
Player of the Week: Ichiro Suzuki, 5 times, August 8, 2004, June 4, 2006, September 26, 2010, September 23, 2012 AL, August 7, 2016 NL; Hideo Nomo, 4 times, June 25, 1995, April 14, September 22, 1996 NL, April 8, 2001 AL; Hideki Matsui, 4 times, June 29, 2003, May 30, 2004, June 19, 2005, July 24, 2011 AL; Shohei Ohtani, 4 times, April 8, September 9, 2018, June 20, July 4, 2021 AL; Kazuhiro Sasaki, April 29, 2001 AL; Daisuke Matsuzaka, May 20, 2007 AL; Hisashi Iwakuma, August 16, 2015 AL; Seiya Suzuki, April 17, 2022 NL; Yu Darvish, September 18, 2022 NL
MLB Players Choice Player of the Year: Shohei Ohtani, 2021
MLB Players Choice Outstanding Player: Ichiro Suzuki, 2004 AL; Shohei Ohtani, 2021 AL
MLB Players Choice Outstanding Rookie: Ichiro Suzuki, 2001 AL
Associated Press Athlete of the Year: Shohei Ohtani, 2021
Sporting News MLB Player of the Year Award: Shohei Ohtani, 2021
Sporting News Rookie Player of the Year Award: Ichiro Suzuki, 2001 AL
Sporting News Rookie Pitcher of the Year Award: Hideo Nomo, 1995 NL, Kazuhiro Sasaki, 2000 AL
Sporting News Rookie of the Year Award: Shohei Ohtani, 2018 AL
Baseball America Major League Player of the Year: Shohei Ohtani, 2021
Baseball America Rookie of the Year Award: Hideo Nomo, 1995; Shohei Ohtani, 2018
Baseball America All-Rookie Team: Yu Darvish, 2012 SP; Masahiro Tanaka, 2014 SP; Kenta Maeda, 2016 SP; Shohei Ohtani, 2018 DH
Baseball Digest Player of the Year: Shohei Ohtani, 2021
Statcast Player of the Year: Shohei Ohtani, 2021
MLB.com Defensive Player of the Year Award: Ichiro Suzuki, 2005
MLB.com Setup Man of the Year Award: Hideki Okajima, 2007
Best Male Athlete ESPY Award: Shohei Ohtani, 2022
Best Major League Baseball Player ESPY Award: Shohei Ohtani, twice, 2021, 2022
United States Sports Academy Athlete of the Month: Shohei Ohtani, June 2021
Time 100: Shohei Ohtani, 2021

Hitting 
Most hits in a single season: Ichiro Suzuki, 262 (2004) MLB Record
 Most career interleague hits: Ichiro Suzuki, 367 MLB Record 
 Most consecutive seasons of 200 or more hits: Ichiro Suzuki, 10 (2001–2010) MLB Record 
 Most seasons with 200 or more hits: Ichiro Suzuki, 10 (2001–2010) MLB Record (tie) 
 Most games with five or more hits in a season: Ichiro Suzuki, 4 (2004) MLB Record (tie) 
 Most pinch-hit plate appearances in a season: Ichiro Suzuki, 109 (2017) MLB Record 
 Most pinch-hit at-bats in a season: Ichiro Suzuki, 100 (2017) MLB Record 
Batting titles: Ichiro Suzuki, 2001 (.350 Avg) and 2004 (.372 Avg)
Only inside-the-park home run in All-Star game history: Ichiro Suzuki, July 10, 2007, AT&T Park, hitting leadoff for the American League
Only MLB player to hit a home run in his first plate appearance of his first three seasons: Kazuo Matsui, 2004 (First pitch), 2005, 2006 (Inside-the-park home run)
First Japanese player to play in the World Series: Tsuyoshi Shinjo, October 19, 2002, Giants vs. Angels, Edison Field, hitting 9th in the lineup as the Designated hitter
First Japanese player to hit a home run: Hideo Nomo, April 28, 1998, Dodgers vs. Brewers, Dodger Stadium
First Japanese player to hit a grand slam: Tsuyoshi Shinjo, May 17, 2002, Giants vs. Marlins, AT&T Park
First Japanese player to hit a walk-off hit: Tsuyoshi Shinjo, May 20, 2001, Mets vs. Dodgers, Shea Stadium
First Japanese player to hit a walk-off home run: Hideki Matsui, July 17, 2003, Yankees vs. Indians, Yankee Stadium
First Japanese player to hit a home run in the postseason: Hideki Matsui, October 4, 2003, Yankees vs. Twins, Metrodome
First Japanese player to hit a home run in the World Series: Hideki Matsui, October 19, 2003, Yankees vs. Marlins, Yankee Stadium
First Japanese player to hit for the cycle: Shohei Ohtani, June 13, 2019, Angels vs. Rays, Tropicana Field (Home run (1st), Double (3rd), Triple (5th), Single (7th))
3,000 hit club: Ichiro Suzuki; entered August 7, 2016
Most walks in a 3-game span: Shohei Ohtani, September 22–24, 2021 (11) AL Record, MLB Record (tie)
Fastest exit velocity by a left-handed hitter: Shohei Ohtani, 119.1 mph. April 10, 2022, Angels vs. Astros, Angel Stadium. Bottom of 3rd, 7th pitch off José Urquidy (Ground rule double)

Baserunning 
Stolen base champion: Ichiro Suzuki, 2001 AL (56 Stolen Bases)
Most consecutive stolen bases: Ichiro Suzuki, April 29, 2006 – May 16, 2007 (45) AL Record

Pitching 
No-hitter
Hideo Nomo (Los Angeles Dodgers): September 17, 1996, vs. Colorado Rockies at Coors Field (110P, 8K, 4BB, 30BF)
Still the only no-hitter at Coors Field, which opened in 1995. It was accomplished before the humidor was installed at Coors Field in 2002. Highest paid attendance (50,066) among all the no-hitters in currently used ballparks.
Hideo Nomo (Boston Red Sox): April 4, 2001, vs. Baltimore Orioles at Oriole Park at Camden Yards (110P, 11K, 3BB, 30BF)
Still the only no-hitter at Oriole Park, which opened in 1992. Earliest no-hitter in a season among all the no-hitters in currently used ballparks. Nomo is one of only five players that have ever pitched at least one no-hitter game in both the National League and American League in Major League Baseball history.
Hisashi Iwakuma (Seattle Mariners): August 12, 2015, vs. Baltimore Orioles at Safeco Field (116P, 7K, 3BB, 29BF)
Fourth no-hitter at Safeco Field, behind Philip Humber, Kevin Millwood, and Félix Hernández.
Maddux
Tomo Ohka (Milwaukee Brewers): June 14, 2005, vs. Tampa Bay Devil Rays at Tropicana Field (98P, 9H, 6K, 0BB, 36BF)
Hiroki Kuroda (Los Angeles Dodgers): July 7, 2008, vs. Atlanta Braves at Dodger Stadium (91P, 1H, 6K, 0BB, 28BF)
Masahiro Tanaka (New York Yankees): April 27, 2017, vs. Boston Red Sox at Fenway Park (97P, 3H, 3K, 0BB, 29BF)
Yusei Kikuchi (Seattle Mariners): August 18, 2019, vs. Toronto Blue Jays at Rogers Centre (96P, 2H, 8K, 1BB, 29BF)
Strikeout champion: Hideo Nomo, 1995 NL (236 Strikeouts) & 2001 AL (220 Strikeouts); Yu Darvish, 2013 AL (277 Strikeouts, led both leagues)
Fastest to reach 1,500 career strikeouts in MLB history: Yu Darvish, June 21, 2021 (1,216 1/3 innings, 197 games)
Fastest to reach 1,000 career strikeouts in MLB history: Yu Darvish, September 8, 2017 (812 innings, 128 games)
Most consecutive quality starts from debut: Masahiro Tanaka (16) MLB Record (tie)
Lowest single-season WHIP in MLB history (at least 50 innings): Koji Uehara, 2013 (0.565)
Most saves in the postseason: Koji Uehara, 2013 (7 saves) MLB Record (tie)
Most strikeouts in a single inning: Kazuhiro Sasaki, April 4, 2003 (4 strikeouts in the 9th Inning) MLB Record (tie)
Most consecutive starts with 8+ strikeouts and 0 walks: Yu Darvish (5), July 22 - August 26, 2019 MLB Record
Most consecutive no decisions: Yu Darvish (10), May 4 - June 21, 2019 MLB Record (tie)
First Japanese pitcher to be recorded with a win in an All-Star Game: Masahiro Tanaka, AL 2019
First Japanese pitcher to be recorded with a save in an All-Star Game: Kazuhiro Sasaki, AL 2001
First pitcher to allow 2 or fewer runs in each of his first 7 postseason starts: Masahiro Tanaka
Fastest pitch recorded by a Japanese pitcher: Shohei Ohtani, 101.4 mph: September 10, 2022, Angels vs. Astros, Minute Maid Park. Bottom of 3rd, pitching to Kyle Tucker

All-Star Game selections 

Bold indicates the player was selected to the starting roster

World Series appearances 

Bold indicates that the team won the World Series that year

Notes 
General

Inline citations

References 
 Rains, Rob. Baseball Samurais: Ichiro Suzuki and the Asian Invasion. New York: St. Martin's Paperbacks, 2001. .

Japan
Baseball players